The heats for the men's 100 metre breaststroke race at the 2009 World Championships took place in the morning and evening of 26 July and the final took place in the evening session of 27 July at the Foro Italico in Rome, Italy.

Records
Prior to this competition, the existing world and competition records were as follows:

The following records were established during the competition:

Results

Heats

Semifinals

Final

External links
Heats Results
Semifinal Results
Finals Results

Breaststroke Men 100